This list provides an inventory of character coding standards mainly before modern standards like ISO/IEC 646 etc.  Some of these standards have been deeply involved in historic events that still have consequences. One notable example of this is the ITA2 coding used during World War II (1939–1945). The nature of these standards is not as common knowledge like it is for ASCII or EBCDIC or their slang names.  While 8-bit is the de facto standard as of 2016, in the past 5-bit and 6-bit were more prevalent or their multiple.

See also 
 ANSEL
 SBCS (single-byte character set)
 DBCS (double-byte character set)
 TBCS (triple-byte character set)
 ITU T.61
 DEC Radix-50
 Cork encoding
 Prosigns for Morse code
 Telegraph code
 TV Typewriter
 SI 960 (7-bit Hebrew ISO/IEC 646)
 Figure space (typographic unit equal to the size of a single typographic figure)
 Six-bit character code
 List of binary codes

References

External links 
 circuitousroot.com: Codes that Don't Count

Character sets
Presentation layer protocols